Angels Den is the Europe's first and largest online investment platform that connects businesses with angel investors. It was founded in 2013 and is authorised by the Financial Conduct Authority (FCA).

Angels Den - now Angels Den Funding - offers an online investing platform, which allows investors to invest in pre-vetted SMEs. 92% of Angels Den funded companies since 2013 are still active today. 

Angels Den is headquartered in Emerson Court, Islington, London, and also has a presence in Poland and Romania, constantly looking for new opportunities to extend.

History 
The process of matching business owners and investors was initially done online, but in July 2008 Angels Den introduced the concept of "SpeedFunding" where entrepreneurs pitch to investors on a one-to-one basis.

In July 2013 the runner-up of the BBC television series The Apprentice, Luisa Zissman, found 16 investors to fund her new business through Angels Den.

In October 2013 Angels Den launched an online platform and a new rebranded website.

Angels Den Funding is currently led by CEO Abhilasha Dafria, the youngest and first female CEO of an ethnic background in the company.

Model 
Angels Den is an online investment platform promoting investment in pre-vetted SMEs (Small and Medium Enterprises - see SME finance.) Investors often play an active role in the business, providing the initial funding, expertise and contacts to drive growth. Once an anchor investor is on board, Angels Den opens funding to other investors.

Angels Den provides various offline pitch events such as "SpeedFunding" events, where entrepreneurs present short elevator pitches to numerous investors on a one-to-one basis. Angels Den also runs "Angel Club" events for pre-screened businesses, as well as private viewings. In addition to this, Angels Den offers free, informative masterclasses to improve knowledge in all areas of investing.

EIS and SEIS
The Enterprise Investment Scheme was launched in 1994. According to Michael Portillo, the EIS' purpose is "to recognise that unquoted trading companies can often face considerable difficulties in realising relatively small amounts of share capital. The new scheme is intended to provide a well-targeted means for some of those problems to be overcome".

The EIS covers five separate forms of tax relief: 30% Income tax relief, Capital Gains Tax Deferral Relief, CGT Freedom, Loss Relief, Inheritance Tax Relief. In August 2012 Chancellor George Osborne launched the Seed Enterprise Investment Scheme which aims to "increase the generosity on the Enterprise Investment Scheme", as well as to " extend this scheme specifically to help new start-up businesses get the seed investment they need". The SEIS provides a  50% Income Tax relief against personal income tax as well as a 28% Capital Gains Tax relief on SEIS eligible investments of up to £100,000.

Most businesses presented to angels via Angels Den and especially via the Tech Club are EIS or SEIS eligible.

Example campaigns 
Equity

Equity pitches on Angels Den offer investors the opportunity to purchase shares in the company. Below are a few example of companies that have raised funding through this method:

See also
 Comparison of business angel networks
 Equity crowdfunding
 Private equity 
 Venture capital

References

External links

Financial services companies of the United Kingdom
2013 establishments in the United Kingdom
Investment companies of the United Kingdom
Companies based in London
Multinational companies headquartered in the United Kingdom